Swamp gum is a common name for a number of Eucalyptus species known for inhabiting swamp lands.

These include:

Eucalyptus bensonii, Mountain swamp gum
Eucalyptus camphora, Mountain swamp gum
Eucalyptus ovata, Swamp gum
Eucalyptus regnans, Swamp gum
Eucalyptus rudis, Swamp gum